Burgankent is a rural locality (a selo) and the administrative centre of Burgankentsky Selsoviet, Tabasaransky District, Republic of Dagestan, Russia. The population was 704 as of 2010. There are 4 streets.

Geography 
Burgankent is located 20 km southeast of Khuchni (the district's administrative centre) by road. Tinit is the nearest rural locality.

References 

Rural localities in Tabasaransky District